The Roman Catholic Diocese of Idiofa is a diocese located in the city of Idiofa  in the Ecclesiastical province of Kinshasa in the Democratic Republic of the Congo.

History
 April 13, 1937: Established as Apostolic Prefecture of Ipamu from the Apostolic Vicariate of Upper Kasai and Apostolic Vicariate of Koango
 February 12, 1948: Promoted as Apostolic Vicariate of Ipamu 
 November 10, 1959: Promoted as Diocese of Ipamu
 June 20, 1960: Renamed as Diocese of Idiofa

Leadership, in reverse chronological order
 Bishops of Idiofa (Roman rite), below
 Bishop José Moko Ekanga, P.S.S. (2009.05.26 4- )
 Bishop Louis Mbwôl-Mpasi, O.M.I. (1997.05.20 – 2006.05.31)
 Bishop Eugène Biletsi Onim (1970.05.21 – 1994.11.04)
 Bishop René Toussaint, O.M.I. (1960.06.20 – 1970.05.21); see below
 Bishop of Ipamu (Roman rite), below
 Bishop René Toussaint, O.M.I. (1959.11.10 – 1960.06.20); see above & below
 Vicars Apostolic of Ipamu (Roman rite), below
 Bishop René Toussaint, O.M.I. (1958.01.16 – 1959.11.10); see above
 Bishop Alfonso Bossart, O.M.I. (1948.02.12 – 1957); see below
 Prefect Apostolic of Ipamu (Roman rite) 
 Father Alfonso Bossart, O.M.I. (1937.06.11 – 1948.02.12); see above

See also
Roman Catholicism in the Democratic Republic of the Congo

References
 GCatholic.org
 Catholic Hierarchy

Mokala, is a Roman Catholic Mission (Parish)of Idiofa Diocese, in the Democratic Republic of Congo, founded in 1950 by Belgians Missionaries, Oblats of Mary Immaculte (OMI). The Patron Saint of Mokala Mission is Christ the King (Chrit Roi). It is one of the education centres of the Diocese because of its best schools, hospitals and training schools.
Kikongo (Kituba) is the main language used for (Mass).

Roman Catholic dioceses in the Democratic Republic of the Congo
Christian organizations established in 1937
Roman Catholic dioceses and prelatures established in the 20th century
1937 establishments in the Belgian Congo
Roman Catholic Ecclesiastical Province of Kinshasa